Suriya is an Indian actor, producer and distributor who works primarily in Tamil cinema. He made a commercially successful cinematic debut in Vasanth's Nerrukku Ner (1997). After few critical and commercial failures, Suriya collaborated with Vasanth again in Poovellam Kettuppar (1999), his first film with his future wife Jyothika.

In 2001, Suriya starred in Bala's Nandha as an ex-convict trying to find his place in society. The film was critically acclaimed and became a turning point in his career. His roles as a police officer in Gautham Vasudev Menon's Kaakha Kaakha (which became his first blockbuster) and a con artist in Bala's Pithamagan, established him as one of Tamil cinema's leading actors. Suriya's performances in both films were praised, winning him a Best Actor nomination for the former and the Best Supporting Actor for Pithamagan at the 51st Filmfare Awards South. The following year, he played dual roles—a hunchback and a college student—in Perazhagan. Suriya's performance was again praised, and he received his first Filmfare Best Actor award. He was also acclaimed for his performance as a student leader in Mani Ratnam's Aayutha Ezhuthu (2004).

In 2005, Suriya starred in three films: Maayavi, Ghajini and Aaru. His performance in Ghajini as a businessman with anterograde amnesia was widely praised, and was commercially successful. Maayavi and Aaru were moderately successful. Suriya then appeared in Vaaranam Aayiram (2008). His dual role as father and son earned him another Filmfare Best Actor award. Suriya's next three films were Ayan (2009), Aadhavan (2009) and Singam (2010). The latter, in which he starred with Anushka Shetty, was his most commercially successful film to that point and spawned two sequels: Singam II (2013) and Si3 (2017). Suriya made his Hindi and Telugu cinema debuts in Ram Gopal Varma's gangster film Rakta Charitra 2 (2010). 

Suriya then played the Buddhist monk and creator of Shaolin Kung Fu, Bodhidharma, and his fictional descendant Aravind, in 7aum Arivu (2011). His only 2012 release was Maattrraan, in which he played conjoined twins. In 2015, Suriya released 36 Vayadhinile, the first film from his 2D Entertainment production company. He played three roles for the first time in Vikram Kumar's successful science fiction film 24 (2016). His performance won the Filmfare Critics Award for Best Actor. Following Thaana Serndha Koottam (2018) and Kaappaan (2019), he worked in the critically acclaimed digital ventures Soorarai Pottru (2020) and Jai Bhim (2021). Soorarai Pottru won Suriya the National Film Award for Best Actor.

Film 
 All films are in Tamil, unless otherwise noted.

As actor

As producer

Other crew positions

Television

Discography

Music video appearances

Short film

See also 
 List of awards and nominations received by Suriya

Notes

References

External links 
 

Male actor filmographies
Indian filmographies